Tinchlik is an urban-type settlement in Navoiy Region, Uzbekistan. Administratively, it is part of the city Navoiy. The population in 1989 was 2424 people.

References

Populated places in Navoiy Region
Urban-type settlements in Uzbekistan